Angela Álvarez (born June 13, 1927) is a Cuban-born American singer and the oldest Latin Grammy Award for Best New Artist winner ever. 
She shared the 2022 award with Silvana Estrada at the 23rd Annual Latin Grammy Awards.

Her songs were first recorded in an album produced  by her grandson Carlos Alvarez with the help of the actor Andy Garcia.

Alvarez appears in the 2022 remake of Father of the Bride (which stars Garcia) singing the beloved Cuban musical standard “Quiéreme mucho”.

References

External links
 
 

Living people
American musicians of Cuban descent
Cuban emigrants to the United States
Latin Grammy Award for Best New Artist
21st-century American women singers
21st-century American singers
Women in Latin music
1927 births